Luvolwethu Mpeta (born 13 January 1990) is a South African footballer who plays as a left-back for Tshakhuma Tsha Madzivhandila.

Club career

North-West University
Mpeta played for the North-West University soccer team from 2008–2010 before graduating with a Diploma in Sports Science.

Platinum Stars
On 30 July 2012, Mpeta joined Platinum Stars on a three-year contract, after playing a friendly with them against Bidvest Wits.

In January 2015, Mpeta rejected an offer by Platinum Stars to renew his contract with interest in him from SuperSport United and Bloemfontein Celtic.

SuperSport United
On 20 January 2015, Mpeta signed a pre-contract with SuperSport United before SuperSport United agreed terms with Platinum Stars for his transfer.

International career
Mpeta played for South Africa U20 and for South Africa U23.

Mpeta was called up to the South Africa senior squad in November 2014, ahead of the 2015 AFCON qualifying matches against Sudan and Nigeria, but did not play, with the coach preferring to play Sibusiso Khumalo.

References

1990 births
Living people
Sportspeople from Bloemfontein
Soccer players from the Free State (province)
South African soccer players
Association football defenders
Platinum Stars F.C. players
F.C. AK players
SuperSport United F.C. players
University of Pretoria F.C. players
Tshakhuma Tsha Madzivhandila F.C. players
South African Premier Division players
National First Division players